The 2014–15 season was Blackburn Rovers 127th season as a professional football club and its third playing in the Football League Championship since the club's relegation during the 2011–12 Premier League season. Manager Gary Bowyer, in his second full season in charge, led the club to a 9th-place finish in The Championship and to the FA Cup quarter-finals.

Summer activity

On 7 May, Tommy Spurr signed a new contract keeping him at Blackburn Rovers until the summer of 2016.

On 16 May, Leeds United confirmed that Luke Varney had been released. Varney had been on loan at Rovers from 8 February 2014 until 11 May 2014 with a view to a permanent move.

On 19 May, it was confirmed that Liam Feeney, who ended the 2013–14 campaign on loan at Blackburn Rovers following six appearances, would join Bolton when his contract at fellow Championship club Millwall expired in the summer.

On 21 May, it was reported that a £300,000 investment had been made in order to replicate the high standards of Ewood Parks surface last season in preparation for the new campaign. The substantial outlay, sanctioned by the owners, also covered the cost of new machinery and an irrigation upgrade on the sprinkler system at the Academy.

On 24 May, Blackburn Rovers announced that Leon Best, D.J. Campbell, Dickson Etuhu, David Goodwillie, Alex Marrow, and Jordan Slew had been placed on the transfer list.

On 26 May, Blackburn Rovers announced one of the best-value season ticket deals in the country for the forthcoming campaign, along with the return of the Premier League Pledge. So, should Rovers achieve promotion in May 2015, then season ticket holders will be able to purchase a 2015–16 season ticket in the top flight for just 25% of the Championship price.

On 27 May, Gary Bowyer stated that he wanted to sign Manchester United defender Michael Keane on a permanent basis after a successful loan spell with Rovers.

On 2 June, following a successful loan spell and 22 appearances for Brentford in the 2013–14 season, Alan Judge returned to Griffin Park permanently, putting pen-to-paper on a three-year contract for an undisclosed fee.

On 20 June, David Goodwillie departed the club by mutual agreement.

On 23 June, Rovers made their first signing of the summer with the capture of Chris Brown from Doncaster.

On 30 June, midfielder John O'Sullivan announced he had signed a new contract with the club with a one-year extension. The 20-year-old, who spent the second half of last season on loan at Southport, took to Twitter to announce he has penned fresh terms.

On 1 July, following the expiration of his Leeds contract, Varney signed a one-year permanent deal with Blackburn.

On 1 July, Dickson Etuhu and DJ Campbell departed the club by mutual agreement.

Also on 1 July, it was announced that a number of young prospects had put pen to paper on new deals at the football club. Jack O'Connell, who had been on loan with Rochdale during a season in which they clinched promotion from League Two, signed a new two-year deal that sees him contacted to Rovers until the summer of 2016. Fellow youth graduates Bradley Bauress, Kellen Daly, and Darragh Lenihan all signed one-year extensions, whilst Academy forward Modou Cham signed a two-year professional contract. Finally Midfielder David Carson officially arrived at Rovers following a successful trial during the previous season. The 18-year-old joined on a one-year deal.

Again on 1 July, it was reported that eighteen-year-old striker Devarn Green had signed terms on a two-year professional deal.

On 10 July, it was confirmed that Josh Morris would link up with Fleetwood Town once more on a six-month loan deal until 3 January 2015.

On 10 July, Jordan Rhodes signed a two-year extension to his existing deal, committing his future to Rovers for the next five years until the summer of 2019.

On 11 July, David Dunn and Markus Olsson re-signed on new one-year deals after their contracts expired.

Also on 11 July, Alex Baptiste became the third player to sign on a busy day of transfer activity at Ewood Park, the defender joined on a season long loan deal from Bolton Wanderers.

On 14 July, Blackburn Rovers announced Zebra Claims Limited as their main sponsor.

On 15 July, Alex Marrow was released by Rovers by mutual consent.

On 4 August, Leon Best joined Derby County on a season-long loan deal.

Also on 4 August, Anthony O'Connor joined Plymouth Argyle on loan until the turn of the year.

On 5 August, Rubén Rochina returned to his homeland by completing a move to Granada CF.

On 22 August, The owners Venky's block a final £10 million+ bid from Hull City, putting an end to news of Rhodes' on-off move to Hull City.

On 31 August, deadline-day for summer transfers, Rovers signed defender Shane Duffy on a permanent deal from Everton (worth around £400,000 plus add-ons). Rovers also agreed to season-long loan deals for Middlesbrough goalkeeper Jason Steele and Fulham midfielder Ryan Tunnicliffe.

New Year Activity
On 1 January, Jason Steele signed a permanent 3.5 year deal at Rovers after a successful loan from Middlesbrough.

On 1 January, Ryan Tunnicliffe recalled early by Fulham boss Kit Symons after a season-long loan deal was cut short.

On 6 January, Leon Best's season-long loan deal was cancelled by Derby County after failing to impress boss Steve McClaren.

On 8 January, Josh Morris re-joined Fleetwood Town on loan for the remainder of the season.

On 10 January, Marcus Olsson has contract extended until summer of 2016 on account of the defender's impressive start to the season.

On 17 January, Rudy Gestede was left out of squad for away game against Wigan Athletic, as talks with an unnamed premier league club were still ongoing with Rovers over the topscorer.

On 19 January, it was announced later that Crystal Palace were the club that had officially placed a bid for the striker Rudy Gestede, supposedly worth £3.5m.

On 20 January, Leon Best is signed on loan by Brighton for the remainder of the season.

On 30 January, Jake Kean joined Oldham Athletic on loan until the end of the season.

Also on 30 January, Jay Spearing signed for Rovers on loan, the midfielder joined from Bolton Wanderers until the end of May.

On 2 February, Jordan Slew left the club after his contract was terminated, whilst Jack O'Connell and Anthony O'Connor joined Brentford and Plymouth respectively on deadline day.

Pre-Season Friendlies
Blackburn Rovers kicked off their pre-season campaign against newly promoted Conference side Telford United. Rovers then flew off to Portugal for a week of warm-weather training.  On their return Rovers faced Accrington Stanley and Bury (of League Two) and Bradford City of League One. Pre-season ended with friendly at home against Premier League club Stoke City managed by ex-Rover Mark Hughes.

Sky Bet Championship

League table

Fixtures

Blackburn Rovers 2014–15 Championship season opener with Cardiff City moved a day forward to Friday 8 August for live TV coverage.

August

September

October

November

December

January

February

March

April

May

Results

Football League Cup

The first round draw of the 2014-15 Football League Cup took place on Tuesday 17 June at 10:00am.

Rovers hosted Scunthorpe United in the first round.

FA Cup

Rovers entered the FA Cup in the Third Round Proper which commenced on Saturday 3 January 2015.

Club Staff

Technical Staff

Medical Staff

Squad statistics

Appearances and Goals

|-
|colspan="14"|Players out on loan:

|-
|colspan="14"|Players that played for Blackburn Rovers this season that have left the club:

|}

Goalscorers

Assists

Disciplinary record

Suspensions served

Transfers

Summer

In

 Total spent  ~ Undisclosed (~ £400,000+)

Youth

Out

 Total sold  £350,000 + undisclosed fees

Loan In

Loan Out

Winter

In

 Total spent  ~ Undisclosed (~ £100,000+)

Out

 Total sold  ~ Undisclosed (~ £300,000+)

Loan In

Loan Out

References

External links
Blackburn Rovers F.C. official website

2014-15
2014–15 Football League Championship by team